Lamellipedia is a proposed clade of arthropods that includes most trilobites (but not Agnostida) and their close relatives. Distinctive of the clade are the flat setae aligned in a comb-like structure on the exopod.

References

Arthropod taxonomy